Enrico Wijngaarde (born 11 January 1974) is a Surinamese football referee who currently resides in Paramaribo. He has been a full international referee for FIFA since 2002.
 
He was selected as a referee for the 2007 FIFA U-20 World Cup in Canada, where he refereed two matches.

References

1974 births
Living people
Surinamese football referees
Sportspeople from Paramaribo
CONCACAF Gold Cup referees
CONCACAF Champions League referees